Brittany Anne Murphy-Monjack (November 10, 1977 – December 20, 2009) was an American actress and singer, known for playing Tai Frasier in the teen movie Clueless (1995), Alex Latourno in 8 Mile (2002) and Daisy Randone in Girl, Interrupted (1999).

Born in Atlanta, Murphy moved to Los Angeles as a teenager and pursued a career in acting. Her breakthrough role was as Tai Frasier in Clueless (1995), followed by supporting roles in independent films such as Freeway (1996) and Bongwater (1998). She made her stage debut in a Broadway production of Arthur Miller's A View from the Bridge in 1997 before appearing as Daisy Randone in Girl, Interrupted (1999) and as Lisa Swenson in Drop Dead Gorgeous (1999).

In the 2000s, Murphy appeared in Don't Say a Word (2001) alongside Michael Douglas, and alongside Eminem in 8 Mile (2002), for which she gained critical recognition. Her later roles included Riding in Cars with Boys (2001), Spun (2002), Just Married (2003), Uptown Girls (2003), Sin City (2005), and Happy Feet (2006). Murphy also voiced Luanne Platter on the animated television series King of the Hill (1997–2010). Her final film, Something Wicked, was released in April 2014.

On December 20, 2009, Murphy died at age 32 under disputed circumstances. The coroner's verdict was pneumonia, exacerbated by anemia and misuse of various prescription medicines.

Early life
Brittany Anne Bertolotti was born in Atlanta, Georgia, to Sharon Kathleen Murphy and Angelo Joseph Bertolotti,  who divorced when she was two years old. Murphy was raised by her mother in Edison, New Jersey. Bertolotti was not named as her father on Brittany's first death certificate. Later in an interview she has stated that Sharon struggled financially, where she forced her to eat spaghetti every night and, on certain occasions, had to beg her mother to buy clothes at KMart; this would later explain Murphy's marked social investment in homeless causes, as discussed in a February 2003 Glamour article. 

Prior to her enrolling at Edison High School, the family moved to Los Angeles in 1991 so that Murphy could pursue an acting career. Murphy said her mother never tried to stifle her creativity, and she considered her mother a crucial factor in her later success: "When I asked my mom to move to California, she sold everything and moved out here for me. She always believed in me." Murphy's mother is of Irish and Slovakian descent and her father is of Italian ancestry. She was raised a Baptist and later became a non-denominational Christian. She had two older half-brothers and a younger half-sister.

Career

1991-1999: child acting and first roles
Murphy attended Verne Fowler School of Dance and Theatre Arts in Colonia, New Jersey, in 1982. From the age of four, she trained in singing, dancing, and acting until her move to California at thirteen. Murphy made her Broadway debut in 1997, as Catherine, in a revival of Arthur Miller's A View from the Bridge opposite veteran actors Anthony LaPaglia and Allison Janney.

Murphy landed her first job in Hollywood when she was thirteen, starring as Brenda Drexell in the series Drexell's Class. She then went on to play Molly Morgan in the short-lived The Torkelsons spinoff Almost Home. Murphy also guest-starred on several television series, including Parker Lewis Can't Lose, Blossom, seaQuest 2032, Murder One and Frasier. She also had recurring roles on Party of Five, Boy Meets World, and Sister, Sister.

Murphy's breakthrough role was in her second feature film, the teen comedy Clueless (1995), directed by Amy Heckerling, which developed a cult following. She followed this with roles in Freeway (1996), with Reese Witherspoon and Kiefer Sutherland, and the independent comedy Bongwater (1998). In 1999, she had a supporting role in James Mangold's Girl, Interrupted as a troubled psychiatric patient alongside Winona Ryder and Angelina Jolie; and as an aspiring beauty queen in Drop Dead Gorgeous. She also voiced the character Luanne Platter on Fox's animated sitcom King of the Hill for the entirety of the show's run from 1997 to 2009, and Joseph Gribble until the fifth season. She was nominated for an Annie Award for voice acting in the King of the Hill episode "Movin' On Up".

2000-2009: acting success and final works
She began the 2000s with a leading role in Don't Say a Word (2001) alongside Michael Douglas; the TV adaptation of the novel The Devil's Arithmetic (2001); 8 Mile (2002), for which she received critical acclaim; and Uptown Girls (2003). In 2003, she starred in the romantic comedies Just Married and Little Black Book (2004) and the critically acclaimed Sin City (2005). Film critic Roger Ebert frequently acclaimed Murphy's acting talent and comedic timing, giving good reviews to several of her films and comparing her to Lucille Ball: 

Murphy followed with several independent films, including as Spun (2002), Neverwas (2005), and Karen Moncrieff's The Dead Girl (2006), as well as two Edward Burns films: Sidewalks of New York (2001) and The Groomsmen (2006). She returned to voice acting with the critically acclaimed 2006 animated feature Happy Feet, as Gloria Penguin. In 2009, she was cast in the Lifetime TV movie Tribute, as the main character, Cilla. Murphy completed the thriller/drama Abandoned in June 2009 and it was released in 2010, after her death. In November 2009, Murphy left the production of The Caller, which was being filmed in Puerto Rico, and was replaced by Rachelle Lefevre. Murphy denied media reports that she had been fired from the project after being difficult on set, and cited "creative differences". Something Wicked, her final film, was released in 2014.

Music

Murphy's career also included work as a singer. She commented: "My singing voice isn't like my speaking voice...I've just always kept it a secret and never taken credit because I wanted to learn how to work behind the microphone in a recording studio, and some of the singers don't even know it was me recording on their albums."

She was in a band called Blessed Soul with fellow actor Eric Balfour in the early 1990s. On June 6, 2006, Murphy and Paul Oakenfold released the single "Faster Kill Pussycat", from the album A Lively Mind. The song became a club hit and hit number one on Billboard Hot Dance Club Play chart. It also hit number seven in Oakenfold's native United Kingdom in June 2006.

She dabbled in music again with the release of the film Happy Feet, in which she covered Queen's "Somebody to Love" and Earth, Wind & Fire's "Boogie Wonderland". Murphy said about her character, Gloria, "Oddly enough, of all the characters I've played, Gloria is the most like me. And she's a penguin! George Miller always wanted one person to do both [the speaking and the singing]. I said, 'I can sing,' and I asked him to give me a shot. I don't think he took me very seriously, because most actors say they can do most things."

Personal life

Relationships

Kutcher, Kwatinetz and Macaluso
In late 2002, she began dating Ashton Kutcher, her co-star in Just Married, where they met while filming the same film. The director of the tape, Shawn Levy, has commented on the relationship saying: "From the minute they met, they were together, they laughed all the time, they made jokes and they looked happy". It was later revealed that they had been engaged, due to both Kutcher and Murphy wearing rings, although it was never officially confirmed. 
Previously engaged to talent manager Jeff Kwatinetz, but their relationship only lasted four months. She was subsequently with Joe Macaluso in December 2005, a production assistant she met while working on the film Little Black Book. Four months after the filming of The Ramen Girl, which was in April 2006, they broke up.

Simon Monjack

Months after her relationship with Macaluso she met Simon Monjack who was known as a British screenwriter. In the 2021 documentary What Happened to Brittany Murphy? several of Monjack's colleagues and friends accused him of being responsible for Murphy's physical changes and also of not letting her connect with her family. According to the testimony of his ex-fiancée, Elizabeth Ragsdale, Monjack "was a disturbed individual who was used to conning people and Brittany was one of his latest victims." In the two-part miniseries, Ragsdale says that Monjack revealed to her that he was suffering from spinal cancer and needed shark cartilage treatments to recover. It wasn't until he left her while Ragsdale was pregnant that she contacted Monjack's mother, Linda Monjack, and realized the story was fake. Linda, who is interviewed in the film, defended her son in this regard, saying that he had developed extreme paranoia after the death of his own father, William Monjack, from cancer: "I certainly don't think he ever went out to tell people that he had cancer. I think she believed it." Before Monjack met Murphy, he met filmmaker Allison Burnett at a dinner party, where he told the assembled guests that he was a billionaire and had dated Elle Macpherson and Madonna; that he had a collection of Ferraris; and that he was dying of brain cancer until he bought a shark fin-derived treatment that saved his life; however, these theories were revealed to be lies. As a result of this, the media suspected that she had been deceived by a scammer. Kathy Najimy, recalled: "[People] were scared and scared. Like, "Who is this man and what's going on?", "She wanted to marry him, and I said, 'darling, it wasn't enough.'"
In May 2007, Murphy married British screenwriter Simon Monjack in a private Jewish ceremony in Los Angeles.

Health
In the early 2000s, Murphy lost a large amount of weight, which led to rumors of a cocaine addiction. In 2005, Murphy disputed such claims to Jane magazine, saying, "No, just for the record I have never tried it in my entire life."

Death
At 8:00 a.m. on December 20, 2009, the Los Angeles Fire Department responded to "a medical request" at the Los Angeles home Murphy and Monjack shared. She had apparently collapsed in a bathroom. Firefighters attempted to resuscitate Murphy on the scene. She was transported to Cedars-Sinai Medical Center, where she died at 10:04 a.m. after going into cardiac arrest.

Autopsy
An autopsy was performed the day after she died. The Los Angeles County Coroner's Office, in a report issued February 2010, said that the manner of death was accidental and that the cause of death was pneumonia, with secondary factors of severe iron-deficiency anemia and multiple drug intoxication. The coroner found a range of over-the-counter and prescription medications in Murphy's system, with the most likely reason being to treat a cold or respiratory infection. These included "elevated levels" of hydrocodone, acetaminophen, L-methamphetamine, and chlorpheniramine, all of which are legal. The report observed: "the possible adverse physiological effects of elevated levels of these medications cannot be discounted, especially in her weakened state."

On December 24, 2009, Murphy was buried at Forest Lawn Memorial Park in Hollywood Hills.

In January 2010, Murphy's husband, Simon Monjack, and her mother, Sharon Murphy, claimed that she did not use alcohol or other drugs, and that drugs did not cause her death; instead they attributed it to a heart condition, mitral valve prolapse.

Simon Monjack's death
On May 23, Monjack was found dead at the same Hollywood Hills residence. The coroner's report attributed his death to acute pneumonia and severe anaemia. It was reported that the Los Angeles County Department of Health had considered toxic mold in their house as a possible cause of the deaths, but this was dismissed by Los Angeles Assistant Chief Coroner Ed Winter, who stated that there were "no indicators" that mold was a factor. Sharon Murphy described the reports of mold contributing to the deaths as "absurd" and went on to state that inspecting the home for mold was never requested by the Health Department.
In December 2011, Sharon Murphy changed her stance, announcing that toxic mold was indeed what killed her daughter and son-in-law, and filed a lawsuit against the attorneys who represented her in an earlier suit against the builders of the home where her daughter and son-in-law died.

In January 2012, Murphy's father, Angelo Bertolotti, applied to the Superior Court of California requesting that the Los Angeles County Coroner's Office be required to hand over samples of his daughter's hair for independent testing. The suit was dismissed seven months later, after Bertolotti failed to attend two separate hearings.

In November 2013, Bertolotti claimed that a toxicology report showed that deliberate poisoning by heavy metals, including antimony and barium, was a possible cause of his daughter's death. Sharon Murphy described the claim as "a smear".

Brittany Murphy Foundation
In January 2010, Murphy's mother, Sharon, and her widower, Simon Monjack, established the Brittany Murphy Foundation, a charitable fund for children's arts education, as well as supporting the USO and cancer research.

The Foundation was launched on February 4, 2010, at a fundraising event at the Saban Theatre in Beverly Hills. After a records search revealed that the foundation's not-for-profit status had not been filed, the foundation refunded any donations received. In an official letter on the foundation's website, they stated that in an effort to get the foundation set up as quickly as possible, they had established it as a private foundation with plans to apply for nonprofit status later. However, they said that they had decided to wait until the foundation's nonprofit status was approved before going any further in order to truly honor Murphy and the foundation's charitable goals.

On November 10, 2013, the Brittany Murphy Foundation was officially relaunched by her father Angelo Bertolotti, according to a press release posted at the foundation's website.

 the Brittany Murphy Foundation appears to be defunct. GuideStar USA, Inc., an information service specializing in reporting on US nonprofit companies, reports that the Brittany Murphy Foundation has not appeared on the IRS Business Master File in a number of months, which may indicate that it has ceased operations.

Legacy
Several events occurred after her death: Dakota Fanning, her co-star in the film Uptown Girls (2003) who maintained a friendship with her, said she appreciated the time they spent together both on the set of the film and at events they attended. attended with her, and that she was "very grateful to have had the opportunity to work together", and the song "Faster Kill Pussycat", by British DJ Paul Oakenfold performed by Murphy, re-entered at number seven on the UK Dance Chart. It also entered the UK Indie Chart in the same week, peaking at number 13.

In October 2021, HBO Max aired a documentary titled What Happened, Brittany Murphy?, covering the mystery surrounding Murphy's death. In the documentary, Murphy's 8 Mile co-star Taryn Manning remembered her as "free-spirited, whimsical and full of laughter". After the documentary premiere, Daniel Fienberg wrote for The Hollywood Reporter that the documentary was "20 percent a reminder of Murphy's transcendent talent, 30 percent a dead-ended investigation into the mystery of her death, and 50 percent an unenlightening examination of Murphy's late husband", and concluded his review saying that "[Murphy] deserved better than the treatment she received in the media, which probably contributed to [Monjack's] ability to control her in the way he did."

In 2023 Alicia Silverstone, who was also her co-star in Clueless (1995) and one of her friends, commented on what it was like working with Murphy during the filming of the film:

Filmography

Feature films

Television

Video games

Music videos

Stage work

Awards and nominations

References

Sources

External links

 
 
 

1977 births
2009 deaths
20th-century American actresses
20th-century American singers
20th-century American women singers
21st-century American actresses
21st-century American singers
21st-century American women singers
Actresses from Atlanta
Actresses from New Jersey
American child actresses
American dance musicians
American film actresses
American people of Irish descent
American people of Italian descent
American people of Slovak descent
American television actresses
American video game actresses
American voice actresses
Burials at Forest Lawn Memorial Park (Hollywood Hills)
Deaths from anemia
Deaths from pneumonia in California
Drug-related deaths in California
Edison High School (New Jersey) alumni
Former Baptists
Musicians from Atlanta
Musicians from Edison, New Jersey
Singers from New Jersey